The Arlington Renegades are a professional American football team based in Arlington, Texas. The team was founded as the Dallas Renegades by Vince McMahon’s Alpha Entertainment and is an owned-and-operated member of the new XFL owned by Dwayne Johnson’s Alpha Acquico. The Renegades play their home games at Choctaw Stadium.

History

McMahon Era (2020)

Dallas (2020) 

On December 5, 2018, Dallas was announced as one of eight cities that would join the newly reformed XFL, as well as Seattle, Houston, Los Angeles, New York, Tampa Bay, and Washington, DC. On February 7, 2019, Bob Stoops, the longtime head coach of the Oklahoma Sooners football team, was hired as the Dallas team's head coach. Stoops was the XFL's first head coaching hire. On April 23, 2019, Stoops named Chris Woods as his defensive coordinator. On May 16, 2019, Stoops named Hal Mumme as his offensive coordinator. The team name and logo were revealed on August 21, 2019, as well as the teams uniforms on December 3, 2019.

On October 15, 2019, The Renegades announced their first player in team history, being assigned former NFL quarterback Landry Jones.

Dallas lost their first game, against the St. Louis BattleHawks, by a 15–9 final. Kicker Austin MacGinnis tallied all of the Renegade points via field goals, but Dallas' failure to reach the end zone came back to haunt them, as St. Louis scored nine unanswered fourth quarter points to erase a slim deficit. Linebacker Tegray Scales had 13 Dallas tackles, three for a loss. The Renegades picked up their first win on the road, a 25–18 triumph over the Los Angeles Wildcats. Running back Cameron Artis-Payne reached the end zone three times on two touchdowns and a one-point conversion. His final score, a 17-yard scoring run in the penultimate minute, was the final blow in a fourth quarter that saw the two teams combined for 34 points. Another road victory awaited the Renegades in Week 3, as they topped the Seattle Dragons 24–12. Two MacGinnis field goals sandwiched a 65-yard touchdown pass from Landry Jones to Donald Parham in a fourth quarter that saw Dallas break a 12–12 tie. Parham reached the end zone twice over the afternoon. The XFL announced that the remainder of the 2020 XFL season had been cancelled due to the COVID-19 pandemic. The team finished with a 2–3 record. On April 10, 2020, the XFL suspended operations, with all employees, players and staff terminated.

Dwayne Johnson and Dany Garcia Era (2023–present)

Arlington (2023–present) 
On August 3, 2020, it was reported that a consortium led by Dwayne "The Rock" Johnson, Dany Garcia, and Gerry Cardinale (through Cardinale's fund RedBird Capital Partners) purchased the XFL for $15 million just hours before an auction could take place; the purchase received court approval on August 7, 2020. The XFL hired Bob Stoops as a Head Coach on April 13, 2022, with the expectation that he would be coaching Dallas. On July 24, 2022, the return of a Dallas XFL franchise was confirmed, this time being known as "Arlington" instead of "Dallas", as well as the hiring of Bob Stoops. On October 31, 2022, the XFL officially announced that the Renegades name would be returning, with a brand new logo.

Market overview 
The Renegades are the first professional outdoor football team to play in the Dallas-Fort Worth Metroplex in a league other than the NFL's  Dallas Cowboys as well as the Dallas Rockets and Fort Worth Braves of the Texas Football League which folded midway through the 1971 season; the metro area has been represented by numerous indoor teams, such as the Arena Football League's Dallas Texans, Fort Worth Cavalry, Dallas Desperados and Dallas Vigilantes, and the Allen Wranglers and Texas Revolution. It entered a relatively crowded sports market to share with the NHL Dallas Stars, NBA Dallas Mavericks, WNBA Dallas Wings , MLB Texas Rangers , MLS FC Dallas , NLL Panther City Lacrosse Club, and MLR Dallas Jackals

Staff

Players

Current roster

Player and Staff History

Head Coach History

Offensive Coordinator History

Defensive Coordinator History

Former Notable Players 
Lance Dunbar - Former Dallas Cowboys Running Back
Landry Jones - Former Pittsburgh Steelers Quarterback, 2013 4th Round Pick
Christian Kuntz - Current Pittsburgh Steelers Long Snapper
Rahim Moore - Former Denver Broncos Safety, 2011 2nd Round Pick
Donald Parham Current Los Angeles Chargers Tight End

Current Notable Players 
Marquette King - Former Oakland Raiders Punter
Will Hill - Former - Baltimore Ravens Defensive Back
Cre'Von LeBlanc - Former Philadelphia Eagles Cornerback
Kyle Sloter - Former Minnesota Vikings Quarterback

References

External links